Goniurosaurus gollum, commonly known as the Gollum leopard gecko, is a gecko endemic to China.

References

Goniurosaurus
Reptiles of China
Reptiles described in 2020
Endemic fauna of China
Organisms named after Tolkien and his works